In enzymology, a copalyl diphosphate synthase is an enzyme that catalyzes the chemical reaction

geranylgeranyl diphosphate  (+)-copalyl diphosphate

Hence, this enzyme has one substrate, geranylgeranyl diphosphate, and one product, (+)-copalyl diphosphate.

This enzyme belongs to the family of isomerases, specifically the class of intramolecular lyases.  The systematic name of this enzyme class is (+)-copalyl-diphosphate lyase (decyclizing). This enzyme participates in diterpenoid biosynthesis.

References

 
 
 
 
 

EC 5.5.1
Enzymes of unknown structure